Jonathan Benjamin Hurwitz (born November 15, 1977) is an American screenwriter, director, and producer best known for his work on Cobra Kai (with Hayden Schlossberg and Josh Heald), the Harold & Kumar films, and American Reunion (with Schlossberg).

Early life 
Hurwitz was born in Byram, New Jersey, to Jewish parents. and lived there for two years. He then moved to Roxbury for 5 years, although following that he grew up mostly in Upper St. Clair, Pennsylvania and Randolph, New Jersey. He met Hayden Schlossberg when they both attended Randolph High School. 

Hurwitz was studying finance at the University of Pennsylvania's Wharton School, with Josh Heald who lived in the same dorm with him during freshman year.  As Schlossberg (who was in college at The University of Chicago) frequently came to visit, he got to know Heald as well.

Career 
Hurwitz was studying finance at the University of Pennsylvania's Wharton School, while Schlossberg was a history major at the University of Chicago with plans of attending law school. It was during this time that they sold their first script Filthy to MGM. Upon selling Filthy, they moved to Hollywood to begin their career in the entertainment industry.

The idea for the first Harold and Kumar film, Harold & Kumar Go to White Castle developed while they were living in Los Angeles. Hurwitz and Schlossberg decided to write a low-budget stoner film and base the main characters on their high school friends from Randolph High School. They based the character of Harold on their real-life friend Harold Lee. Hurwitz got the idea to base the film around White Castle from his own experience craving White Castle burgers when he lived in Pennsylvania for several years. At the time, Pennsylvania did not have any White Castle locations and Hurwitz had to have family members bring him frozen White Castle burgers from New Jersey. It was later followed by Harold & Kumar Escape from Guantanamo Bay and A Very Harold & Kumar 3D Christmas. They also wrote and directed the fourth theatrical entry in the American Pie franchise, writing and directing American Reunion (2012). In 2015, the trio signed a deal with Lionsgate.

They currently work on Cobra Kai, a continuation of The Karate Kid franchise. Hurwitz & Schlossberg created the show, along with their close friend Josh Heald. The trio serve as executive producers, show runners, writers, and directors on the series. As of 2021, he and his friend Hayden Schlossberg, along with Josh Heald via Counterbalance Entertainment has signed a deal with Sony Pictures Television.

Filmography

See also 
Hayden Schlossberg
Josh Heald

References

External links 

 

1977 births
Living people
Jewish American screenwriters
American male screenwriters
Comedy film directors
People from Morristown, New Jersey
Place of birth missing (living people)
People from Randolph, New Jersey
Randolph High School (New Jersey) alumni
Wharton School of the University of Pennsylvania alumni
Screenwriters from New Jersey
21st-century American Jews